Lee Young-jun (born 23 May 2003) is a South Korean footballer who plays as a forward for Gimcheon Sangmu.

Career statistics

Club

References

2003 births
Living people
People from Suwon
South Korean footballers
Association football forwards
K League 1 players
Suwon FC players
Gimcheon Sangmu FC players